"Expenses" is the seventh episode of the third season of the AMC television series Better Call Saul, the spinoff series of Breaking Bad. The episode aired on May 22, 2017 on AMC in the United States. Outside of the United States, the episode premiered on streaming service Netflix in several countries.

Plot 
Jimmy McGill picks up garbage as part of his community service. At the same time, he uses his cell phone to conduct business for "Saul Goodman Productions". At the end of his four-hour shift, his supervisor credits Jimmy with only thirty minutes. Jimmy shoots a commercial for a reclining chair store but the owner declines Jimmy's offer to shoot more. Jimmy gives Kim Wexler the money for his share of their office expenses, which concerns her because she thinks he might be exhausting his savings.

Nacho Varga breaks into Daniel Wormald's house. When Daniel arrives, Nacho offers him $20,000 to obtain empty capsules that look like Hector Salamanca's nitroglycerin. Mike Ehrmantraut assists with the construction of a playground for Stacey Ehrmantraut's church and accepts help from other support group members, including Anita. Mike later heads to the courthouse parking lot to start his shift, where Daniel asks Mike to be his bodyguard again. Mike refuses and advises Daniel not to meet Nacho.

Paige Novick praises Kim's cross-examination of Chuck McGill at Jimmy's disciplinary hearing, which led to Chuck's meltdown. Kim expresses regret for having destroyed Chuck's reputation.

At the support group, Mike befriends Anita after she recounts how her husband mysteriously disappeared. The story compels Mike to agree to be Daniel's bodyguard.

During dinner with Jimmy, Kim briefly plays along with a con but makes sure he knows they are not going to follow through. When Kim wonders whether they did the right thing by causing Chuck's meltdown, Jimmy replies that what happened to Chuck was Chuck's fault.

Mike and Daniel meet with Nacho, who tells Mike that Hector wants to use Manuel Varga's upholstery shop as a front for Hector's drug trade, so Nacho intends to kill Hector by switching his anitroglycerin for a placebo. Mike advises Nacho that if Hector dies, Nacho should take the fakes from Hector and replace them with the real ones so the cause of Hector's death will not be obvious.

Jimmy tries to obtain a refund on his malpractice insurance premium. The agent is unable to comply because he needs to be covered if someone accuses him of past malpractice while his license is suspended. The agent also informs Jimmy that his premium will rise substantially after he is reinstated. Jimmy appears distressed and mentions Chuck's breakdown as the reason. He sneers as he departs, aware that he has caused trouble for Chuck.

Reception

Ratings 
Upon airing, the episode received 1.65 million American viewers, and an 18–49 rating of 0.7. With Live+7 viewing factored in, the episode had an overall audience of 4.2 million viewers, and a 1.7 18–49 rating.

Critical reception 
The episode received critical acclaim from critics. On Rotten Tomatoes, it garnered a 93% rating with an average score of 8.63/10 based on 14 reviews. The site consensus reads, "An award-worthy lead performance among a torrent of quality drama and sharp dialogue add up to a winning showcase for Better Call Saul's continued evolution." Due to his nomination, Bob Odenkirk submitted this episode for consideration for the Primetime Emmy Award for Outstanding Lead Actor in a Drama Series for the 69th Primetime Emmy Awards.

References

External links 
"Expenses" at AMC

Better Call Saul (season 3) episodes